Vladislav Vladimirovich Larin (born 7 October 1995) is a Russian taekwondo fighter, World and European Champion and fivefold Grand Prix series winner.

Early life
Vladislav Larin was born 7 October 1995 in the village of Kotkozero, Karelia. When he was five, his family moved to Petrozavodsk, the capital of Karelia. He practiced artistic gymnastics before receiving a longtime hand injury at the age of 5, urging him to discontinue. In 2002 he switched to taekwondo, attending and finishing the Institute for Physical Culture, Sports and Tourism of the Petrozavodsk State University, where he practiced taekwondo.

Personal life
On 16 August 2020, Larin married ninefold Russian poomse taekwondo champion Anastasia. Their wedding took place in Karelia.

References

External links
 

Living people
1995 births
Russian male taekwondo practitioners
Taekwondo practitioners at the 2015 European Games
European Games medalists in taekwondo
European Games silver medalists for Russia
World Taekwondo Championships medalists
European Taekwondo Championships medalists
Taekwondo practitioners at the 2020 Summer Olympics
Olympic gold medalists for the Russian Olympic Committee athletes
Medalists at the 2020 Summer Olympics
Olympic medalists in taekwondo
Sportspeople from the Republic of Karelia
Olympic taekwondo practitioners of Russia
20th-century Russian people
21st-century Russian people